Tabernaemontana muricata is a species of plant in the family Apocynaceae. It is endemic to the state of Amazonas in northwestern Brazil.  The species is listed as endangered.

References

Endemic flora of Brazil
muricata
Plants described in 1819
Endangered plants
Taxonomy articles created by Polbot